Brandt may refer to:

Places

United States
 Brandt, Ohio, an unincorporated community
 Brandt, South Dakota, a town
 Brandt Township, Polk County, Minnesota

Elsewhere
 Mount Brandt, Queen Maud Land, Antarctica
 Brandt Cove, South Georgia Island, Atlantic Ocean
 3503 Brandt, an asteroid

Other uses
 Brandt (name)
 Brandt (company), a German rusk and chocolate manufacturer
 Brandt (brand), a French brandname producing various home equipment
 Brandt House (disambiguation), several houses on the US National Register of Historic Places
 Brandt Centre, an arena in Regina, Saskatchewan, Canada

See also
 
 
 Brand (disambiguation)
 Brant (disambiguation)
 Ernie Brandts (born 1956), Dutch former footballer
 Brandts Museum of Photographic Art, Odense, Denmark

de:Brandt#Bekannte Namensträger